General Sounthone Pathammavong (1911–1985) was the Prime Minister of the Kingdom of Laos from 31 December 1959 to 7 January 1960 and Army Chief of Staff of Royal Lao Armed Forces.

References

1911 births
1985 deaths
Prime Ministers of Laos